Wang Jing-li (born 7 September 1976 in Taiwan) is a Taiwanese baseball player who currently plays for Brother Elephants of Chinese Professional Baseball League. He currently plays as short relief pitcher for the Elephants.

In 2007 CPBL season, he gained the Holds Championship Award.

In 2009, he was one of the players investigated in regards to a match-fixing scandal involving the Elephants.

Career statistics

References

External links
 

1976 births
Living people
Brother Elephants players
Baseball players from Taipei